Daramrud may refer to:

 Daramrud-e Olya, Kermanshah Province
 Daramrud-e Sofla, Kermanshah Province
 Daramrud, Kurdistan
 Daramrud, Lorestan
 Daramrud, alternate name of Tazehabad, Delfan, Lorestan Province

See also
 Daram Rud (disambiguation)